The fauna of Ireland comprises all the animal species inhabiting the island of Ireland and its surrounding waters.

Summary
This table uses figures supplied by the National Parks and Wildlife Service.

Vertebrates by class

Mammals

Only 26 land mammal species (including bats, but not including marine mammals) are native to Ireland, because it has been isolated from the European mainland (by rising sea levels after the Midlandian Ice Age), since about 14,000 BC.
Some species, such as the red fox, European hedgehog, stoat, otter, pygmy shrew, and badger are common, whereas others, like the Irish hare, red deer, and pine marten are less common and generally seen only in certain national parks and nature reserves around the island. Some introduced species have become thoroughly naturalised, e.g. the European rabbit, grey squirrel, bank vole, and brown rat. In addition, ten species of bat are found in Ireland.

Megafaunal extinctions
In the Ice Age (which included warm spells), mammals such as the woolly mammoth, muskox, wild horse, giant deer, brown bear, spotted hyena, cave lion, Arctic lemming, Norway lemming, Arctic fox, European beaver, wolf, Eurasian lynx, and reindeer flourished or migrated depending on the degree of coldness. The Irish brown bear was a genetically distinct (clade 2) brown bear from a lineage that had significant polar bear mtDNA. The closest surviving brown bear is Ursus arctos middendorffi in Alaska.  Excavations of Barbary macaque remains indicate the species was artificially brought to Ireland at some point in the past.

Reptiles

Only one land reptile is native to the country, the viviparous lizard. It is common in national parks, particularly in the Wicklow Mountains. Slowworms are common in parts of The Burren area in County Clare, but they are not a native species and were probably introduced in the 1970s. Five marine turtle species appear regularly off the west coast, the leatherback, green, hawksbill, loggerhead, and Kemp's ridley, but they very rarely come ashore.

Legend attributes the absence of snakes in Ireland to Saint Patrick, who is said to have banished them from the island, chasing them into the sea after they assailed him during a 40-day fast he was undertaking on top of a hill. In reality, no species of snake ever inhabited Ireland, due to it losing its land-bridge to Britain before snakes came north after the Ice Age.

Amphibians

Three amphibians are found in Ireland, the common European brown frog, the smooth newt, and the natterjack toad. There are questions over whether the frog is actually native to Ireland, with some historic accounts stating that the frog was introduced in the 18th century. The natterjack toad is only found in a few localised sites in County Kerry and western County Cork. For atlases see Atlases of the flora and fauna of Britain and Ireland. It reached Ireland sometime after the ice age.

Birds

About 400 bird species have been recorded in Ireland. Many of these species are migratory. There are Arctic birds, which come in the winter, and birds such as the swallow, which come from Africa in the summer to breed. Many birds which are common residents in Britain and continental Europe are rare or unusual in Ireland, examples include the tawny owl, willow tit, marsh tit, nuthatch, and all woodpecker species except the recently established great spotted woodpecker. These are birds which do not move great distances and their absence may be due to Ireland's early isolation, but also Ireland's mild weather means early breeding and choice of best habitats which gives residents an advantage over visitors.

Although Ireland has fewer breeding species than Britain and Continental Europe (because there are fewer habitat types, fewer deciduous woodlands, Scots pine forests, heaths, and high mountain ranges), there are important populations of species that are in decline elsewhere. Storm petrels (largest breeding numbers in the world), roseate tern, chough, and corncrake. Four species of bird have Irish subspecies. These are the coal tit (Parus ater hibernicus), dipper (Cinclus cinclus hibernicus), jay (Garrulus glandarius hibernicus), and red grouse ( Lagopus lagopus hibernicus).

The wren, robin, blackbird, and common chaffinch are the most widespread species, occurring in 90% of the land area. These and the rook, starling, great tit, and blue tit are among the most numerous and commonly seen. Over the period 1997–2007, populations of pigeons, warblers, tits, finches, and buntings have remained stable or shown an increase (there were massive declines during the 1970s). Kestrel, swift, skylark, and mistle thrush have continued to decline due to changes in agricultural practices such as increased use of pesticides and fertiliser. Climate change has also played a role.
For atlases see Atlases of the flora and fauna of Britain and Ireland

Ireland has a rich marine avifauna, with many large seabird colonies dotted around its coastline such as those on the Saltee Islands, Skellig Michael, and the Copeland Islands. Also of note are golden eagles, recently reintroduced after decades of extinction (Golden Eagle Reintroduction Programme in County Donegal). Another conservation effort is habitat management to encourage the red-necked phalarope.

South-eastern Wexford is an important site for birds - the north side of Wexford Harbour, the North Slob, is home to 10,000 Greenland white-fronted geese each winter (roughly one-third of the entire world's population), while in the summer Lady's Island Lake is an important breeding site for terns, especially the roseate tern. 
Three-quarters of the world population of pale bellied brent geese winter in Strangford Lough in County Down.

In 2001, the golden eagle was reintroduced into Glenveagh National Park after a 90-year absence from Ireland. A total of 46 golden eagles have been released in Ireland since 2001. In 2007, the first golden eagle chick hatched in Ireland since re-introduction. In 2006, 30 red kite birds originally from Wales were released in the Wicklow Mountains. Six weeks later one was shot dead, it was found to have 8 shotgun pellets in it. The first red kite chick hatched in 2010. In 2007, the white-tailed eagle returned to Ireland with six young birds being released in Killarney National Park after an absence of over 200 years from Ireland. Fifteen of these birds have been released in total. There are plans for the common crane to also return to Ireland in the future. While the osprey and marsh harrier have slowly returned to Ireland naturally.

In July 2019, Birdwatch Ireland reported that the Irish bird population was in "dramatic" decline, with 40 percent of the country's waterbirds, or half a million, lost in the prior 20 years. Loss of habitat was cited as the reason for the decline. Other reasons were climate changes, agriculture, hedge cutting, pollution, and the burning of scrub. Birdwatch Ireland called for the Citizens' Assembly to examine the biodiversity loss. One of every five Irish bird species assessed in the survey was threatened with extinction. Lapwing numbers, according to Birdwatch Ireland, were down 67% in twenty years. It also said there had been an "almost complete extermination" of farmland birds, for example the corncrake. The curlew was reported on the verge of extinction in Ireland, with only 150 pairs remaining. In the 1960s, 5,000 pairs had been reported.

Fish

Ireland has 375 fish species in its coastal waters and 40 freshwater species in its rivers and lakes. Most of these are pelagic. There are many aquatic mammals too, such as bottlenose dolphins, orca whales, and harbour porpoises. Sea turtles are also common off the western seaboard, and the walrus has also been found around the Irish coasts, but is very rare with only a handful of sightings. The cool, temperate waters around Ireland contain a huge variety of marine invertebrates Some of this diversity can be observed in tide pools.

There are 24 species of cetaceans and five species of sea turtles that have been recorded in Irish waters. The giant squid has been recorded on five occasions.

The Porcupine Abyssal Plain which has an average depth of 4,774 m is on the continental margin southwest of Ireland. It is the habitat for many deep sea fish and was first investigated in the summers of 1868 and 1869 by Charles Wyville Thomsons H.M.S. Porcupine expedition. Other notable fish include the basking shark, ocean sunfish, conger eel,  hagfish, boarfish (Capros aper), large-eyed rabbitfish, lumpsucker, cuckoo wrasse, and the thresher shark.

In a study of the marine fauna of the Celtic Sea based on 61 beam trawl catches, the common dragonet and the hermit crab Pagurus prideaux were the most ubiquitous species.

Invertebrates by phylum

Insects and other arthropods

There are an estimated 11,500 species of insect recorded in Ireland (11,422 actual at October 2010: in well-known groups 1,400 of these moths, 33 species of dragonflies/damselflies and 34 species of butterfly). Many more remain to be found. Six checklists of the Irish insect fauna have been published to date-Coleoptera, Lepidoptera, Diptera, Hymenoptera, and Hemiptera and small orders. The history and rationale of the lists is detailed by O'Connor. Spiders are represented by 378 species.
Literature on other Irish land invertebrates can be accessed on the CEDaR Literature Database using the key words search facility. The site is regularly updated but gaps still exist.

For atlases See Atlases of the flora and fauna of Britain and Ireland

Notable Irish species include the freshwater pearl mussel, diving bell spider, marsh fritillary butterfly, Kerry slug, Semilimax pyrenaicus, freshwater crayfish, the white prominent moth, and Roesel's bush-cricket.

The aquatic insect fauna is listed by Ashe et al.

Extinctions
Species that have become extinct in Ireland in historic times include the great auk, the Irish elk, the brown bear, Eurasian lynx, grey whale, and the wildcat.  The last grey wolf in Ireland was killed by John Watson of Ballydarton on the slopes of Mount Leinster, County Carlow in 1786. Many bird of prey species including the golden eagle, white-tailed eagle, and red kite have been re-introduced to national parks after absences between 90 and 200 years.

Zoology museums
These are the Natural History Museum Dublin which opened in 1856 and the Ulster Museum in Belfast which opened in 1929. Ireland's universities hold smaller collections. Trinity College Dublin also has a Zoological museum that is open during the summer months.

Research
In 2000, scientists in Ireland commenced a research programme called "Ag-Biota", concerning the impact of modern agriculture on biodiversity.

There is also continuous monitoring and research on Irish biodiversity carried out by the National Biodiversity Data Centre based in Waterford.

History
An early (1180) account of the fauna is given by Gerald of Wales in Topographia Hibernica and in 1652 Gerard Boate's Natural History of Ireland was published. Also in the 17th century Thomas Molyneux made observations. The Clare Island Survey (1909–11) organised by Robert Lloyd Praeger was the first comprehensive biological survey carried out in the world. It became a model for studies elsewhere.

Composition of the fauna
Details of the composition of the Irish fauna by group are given by Ferriss, S. E., Smith, K. G. and Inskipp, T. P.(editors), 2009 Irish Biodiversity: a taxonomic inventory of fauna. The online source is not up to date for all taxa.

Further reading
 Cabot,D. 2009 Ireland Collins New Naturalist Series  Natural history of Ireland biological history, geology and climate, habitats and nature conservation. Flora and fauna
 
 
 
 Nunn, J.D. (ed.) 2002 Marine Biodiversity in Ireland and Adjacent Waters. Proceedings of a Conference 26–27 April 2001. Ulster Museum publication no. 8.
 Irish Wildlife Manuals is a series of contract reports relating to the conservation management of habitats and species in Ireland. The volumes are published on an irregular basis by Ireland's National Parks and Wildlife Service.
 Praeger, R. Ll. 1950. Natural History of Ireland. Collins, London.

Scientific journals
 Bulletin of the Irish Biogeographical Society
 Irish Naturalists' Journal
 Proceedings of the Royal Irish Academy

See also
 Flora of Ireland
 List of mammals in Ireland
 List of birds of Ireland
 List of amphibians of Ireland
 List of reptiles of Ireland
 List of butterflies in Ireland
 List of moths of Ireland
 List of Diptera of Ireland
 List of Odonata species of Ireland
 List of non-marine molluscs of Ireland
 List of marine molluscs of Ireland
 List of Nemertea of Ireland
 List of seaslugs (Nudibranchia) of Ireland
 List of British Isles rockpool life
 Deer of Ireland
 Wolves in Ireland
 Bears in Ireland
 Belfast Natural History Society
 List of fish of Ireland
 Dublin University Zoological Association
 National Parks in the Republic of Ireland
 Irish zoologists History
 Lusitanian distribution
 Invasion biology terminology
 List of endemic species of the British Isles
 Fauna of Europe
 Synopses of the British Fauna

References

External links

 National Biodiversity Network NBN Atlas - UK’s largest collection of biodiversity information Distribution Maps (Ongoing)
 Biodiversity Ireland includes datasets and maps
 National Parks and Wildlife Service
 Habitas Ulster Museum Note some parts of this extensive website relate to Northern Ireland only.
 Fauna Europaea  Some parts are more complete than others. Northern Ireland and Ireland are separated.
 Colonisation of Ireland by the stoat Wayback Machine Provides a useful overview of post glacial colonisation.
 Irish Bees
 Water Beetles of Ireland
 Dragonflies of Ireland
 NPWS Irish Syrphidae database
The Crossley ID Guide to the Birds of Britain and Ireland
 Freshwater Fish of Ireland
 Fishbase Marine fish of Ireland. The species list accesses an account of the species in Ireland. For more go to the species page. Click on the photo here for more photos
 MarLIN Marine Life Information Network for Britain and Ireland.
 Inventory of Irish Marine Wildlife Publications
 World Register of Marine Species
 Commons Red Deer Page Extensive illustration.
 Irish Species Register
 Biological Records Centre UK organisation but Atlas maps include Ireland.
 NIEA (SSI s, SACs, NRs, MNRs, Ramsar sites and SPAs)
 Invasive Species
 MothsIreland Species lists (Micromoths separate). Maps.
 Eugenie Regan, Brian Nelson, Stephen McCormack, Robert Nash and James P. O’Connor 2010 Countdown to  2010: Can we assess Ireland's insect species diversity and loss Biology and Environment: Proceedings of the Royal Irish Academy, Vol. 110B, No. 2, 109–117
 BHL Forbes, A.E., 1905 Gaelic names of beasts (Mammalia), birds, fishes, insects, reptiles, etc. in two parts: 1. Gaelic-English.- 2. English-Gaelic. Part 1. contains Gaelic names or terms for each of the above, with English meanings. Part 2. contains all the English names for which Gaelic is given in Part 1 Edinburgh, Oliver and Boyd.
 EU-Nomen Pan-European Species Directories Infrastructure To access the Ireland list go to advanced search > occurrence then select Ireland from the menu. Accesses 12,503 Species and 432 Subspecies.
 Database of Irish Lepidoptera.1 Macrohabitats, microsites and traits of Noctuidae and butterflies Includes a generally applicable habitat list.
 BWARS Bees, wasps and ants maps and info
 The leaf and stem mines of British (Isles) flies and other insects
 Marine bivalve Mollusca of the British Isles
 Eunis Habitats Classification
Marine species identification portal

 
Biota of archipelagoes
Biota of Ireland